Hugh White Comstock (April 17, 1893 – June 1, 1950) was an American designer and master builder who lived in Carmel-by-the-Sea, California. He and Michael J. Murphy were responsible for giving Carmel its unique architectural character. Comstock developed a "Fairy Tale," storybook architectural style, that has been closely identified with Carmel. Twenty-one of his cottages remain in the area today. Comstock developed a modern use of adobe in the construction of a post-adobe brick called "Bitudobe."

Early life 

Hugh W. Comstock was born in Evanston, Illinois on April 17, 1893. He was one of the seven children of John Adams Comstock and Nellie Hurd of Evanston. He grew up on his family's farm in Evanston. In 1907, his parents sold the farm and moved to Santa Rosa, California. In 1924, Comstock traveled to Carmel-by-the-Sea, California to visit his sister Catherine and her husband, George J. Seideneck, who were members of the Carmel Art Association. His brother was Judge James Hilliard Comstock of Santa Rosa.

Comstock had a ranch in Yolo County, California. He met Mayotta Browne (1891-1979) in Carmel. She had a successful business making and selling hand-made “Otsy-Totsy” dolls. They were married on April 14, 1924, in Salinas.

Professional background

Because of his wife's successful doll business, Mayotta asked Comstock to build her a cottage to showcase her dolls. He and his wife designed and built, a  "Fairy Tale" style cottage called "Hansel" on Torres Street near sixth Avenue in 1924. His storybook design was inspired by the English children's book illustrator Arthur Rackham. In 1925, he built the cottage "Gretel." These cottages were followed by a series of other cottages listed below.  

In 1926, Comstock designed and built Tuck Box, located on Dolores Street between Ocean & 7th Avenue. It was built in the Craftsman, Fairy Tale style, and features a steep gabled shingled roof, stucco walls, faux-timber beams, multi-pane glass windows, and used brick for an uneven chimney. In November 1931, Lemos built the Garden Shop Addition, which is between the Tuck Box and the El Paseo Building. When it first opened it sold cut flowers, gift plants, and pottery. Both buildings were recorded with the Department of Parks and Recreation on October 8, 2002.

In 1941, two sisters converted the building into a tea room and named it "Tuck Box" after the trunks British schoolchildren used to carry their books and supplies. Today it is still a tea room that serves sandwiches, salads, hot tea in teapots, and scones with cream, orange marmalade, and other preserves.

Comstock was in charge of the reconstruction of the Forest Theater in 1939 as part of a $20,000 Works Progress Administration project. He drew up the plans, wowrking with major Herbert Heron.

He designed and built the two-story Spanish Mission Revival style Monterey County Trust & Savings Building (now the China Art Building) in 1930.

His distinctive, Tudor "Fairy Tale" style of architecture became popular, and people started to ask him to build more cottages and stores. Comstock used native materials, using Carmel Valley chalk rock, natural wood, hand-carved planks, terracotta tile, redwood shingles, and hand forged fixtures. The cottages have steep gables, wooden half-timbering with stucco and plaster surfaces, and wood and diamond-paned windows. They often had tall, narrow chimneies covered in battered Carmel stone to create a rustic appearance.

Comstock built his studio in 1927 on the corner of Santa Fe Street & 6th Avenue, as an English county house.

During the Great Depression Comstock used cheaper materials. He made adobe bricks in a plant he built in Carmel Valley. His first adobe house was built in 1936. He made a specialized adobe brick called "Bitudobe." In 1948, he published the book Post-Adobe; Simplified Adobe Construction Combining A Rugged Timber Frame And Modern Stabilized Adobe, which described his method of construction, including how to make "Bitudobe." In 1938, he served as an adviser to the architects Franklin & Kump Associates, who built the Carmel High School, which used his Post-adobe system.

Comstock was a Carmel civil leader, on the board of the Carmel Sanitary District for over ten years and was president of the Carmel Unified School District. He helped to outlaw sidewalks and mail delivery to preserve the "forest ambiance." In 1946, he became a member of the Carmel Planning Commission.

Notable work
The following buildings in the Carmel area are attributed to Comstock, most notably the following:

Death
Comstock died on June 1, 1950, at the age of 57, at the Santa Barbara Cottage Hospital, in Santa Barbara, California. His wife, Mayotta Comstock survived him. He was buried at the Mountain View Cemetery in Oakland, California. His wife died on May 30, 1979, at the age of 87, in Sacramento, California. She was cremated and her remains taken to the Mountain View Cemetery in Oakland.

References

External links

 Carmel Heritage Society
 The Fairy Tale Houses of Carmel by Joanne Mathewson
 Cottages By The Sea by Linda Leigh Paul (2000)
 Carmel Fairy Tale Cottages by Mike Barton (2011)
 Post-adobe; Simplified Adobe Construction Combining a Rugged Timber Frame and Modern Stabilized Adobe, Hugh W Comstock, 1948

1893 births
1950 deaths
People from California
People from Illinois